Pigeon Lake Provincial Park is a provincial park located in central Alberta, Canada, within the County of Wetaskiwin No. 10.

The park is located on the southwestern shore of Pigeon Lake. It was established on May 26, 1967.

External links
 Alberta Community Development - Pigeon Lake Provincial Park

Provincial parks of Alberta
County of Wetaskiwin No. 10